Merja Zerga or Lagune de Moulay Bou Selham is a tidal lagoon on the Atlantic coast of Morocco, 70 km north of the city of Kenitra. Classified as a Permanent Biological Reserve in 1978, it is managed by several government agencies.

The lagoon, which covers 4,500 hectares, receives water from the Oued Drader and from the local water table. Its average depth is 1.5 metres. The area's annual rainfall (600–700 mm) results in winter floods that inundate the surrounding areas. 

A Ramsar Convention site, the lagoon hosts 100 bird species and has been identified as a key site on the East Atlantic Flyway. Between 15,000 and 30,000 ducks overwinter at the lagoon, and it regularly holds 50,000 to 100,000 waders. Its permanent species include Asio capensis. Winter visitors include ruddy shelduck, common shelduck, gadwall, Eurasian wigeon, northern shoveler, marbled teal, greater flamingo, common coot, pied avocet, grey plover, and slender-billed curlew.

References

Protected areas of Morocco
Ramsar sites in Morocco
Geography of Rabat-Salé-Kénitra